Nathan Mumm (from Everett, Washington) is a Snohomish County multi-business executive. Born in 1973, his success in both property management, and technology investments have allowed him the ability to venture in many local businesses.  He is the current radio talk show host for TechTimeRadio with Nathan Mumm. He was the original owner of the Snohomish County Explosion that played in the National Athletic Basketball League and International Basketball League. He is currently the President of Courtyard Media Foundation, a non-profit foundation in Snohomish County. Mumm is known as a key leader in Snohomish County regarding business and entertainment. He was the founder of the National Athletic Basketball League and was the commissioner and compliance director. Growing up in the town of Marysville he graduated from Marysville Pilchuck High School in 1992. He currently lives in the town of Snohomish, Washington.

Business Career 
A graduate of Marysville Pilchuck High School, Nathan studied Business at Everett Community College. He left college early to work for Microsoft, where he remained for thirteen years before retiring. He is a graduate of the Thunderbird School of Global Management with an Executive Certificate in International Marketing.

In 2011 Nathan was elected to the board of the National Athletic Basketball League and was elected as the first commissioner of the league. Mumm the original co-founder of the National Athletic Basketball League which started in 2010 sold the startup professional league to Productive Citizens Incorporated in summer of 2011. Considered the driving force behind the 2 year league, Mumm demonstrated great leadership to go along with his everlasting competitive spirit. The league decided to honor Nathan Mumm by naming its championship trophy after him.

Mumm served for ten years on the Pacific Northwest Leadership board in Snohomish County.  Currently Mumm is working a new original sport called "Gridiron-Ball" and is looking to start up a league of this unique sport in the winter of 2020.

Elite Executive Services: 2019 - Current

Mumm works as the Chief Information Officer CIO for high networth business with their CIO on Demand services based in the Greater Seattle area. He continues to be a top speaker on many technology topics from Keynote Segments to breakout meeting room lectures. In 2020, Nathan Mumm was interviewed on The Shrimp Tank Podcast Seattle - The Best Entrepreneur Podcast In The Country.
In 2021, Nathan Mumm was interviewed on Unleashed the Podcast.

TechTimeRadio with Nathan Mumm: 2020 - Current

Mumm is the main host of the popular technology radio show that airs nationwide across the United States called TechTimeRadio with Nathan Mumm. The show broadcasts weekly from the studio of 1150am KKNW (Seattle) and 880am KIXI (Seattle). This public radio show is currently broadcasting in Seattle, Los Angeles, Boston, Chicago, Atlanta, New York, and San Francisco markets. He is also the creative producer of the show with the tagline "The Show that Makes you go Hummmm, Technology News of the Week. This is a unique technology show as it gears it show to the common person and the hosts drink whiskey and review a new flavor each week on the show. 

Courtyard Media Foundation: 2005-Present

Mumm as the President, working at Courtyard Media Foundation, he was in charge of all aspects of the Basketball Operations for the Everett Explosion (2007 season) / Snohomish County Explosion (2008-2010 season) Professional Minor league basketball team.

Copiers Northwest | BluZEBRA Technology: 2014-2019

Mumm worked as the Chief Technology Officer CTO for the 40 million dollar private company in Seattle and oversaw all technical items related to Copiers Northwest internal Technology Department along with the Managed Service Provider (MSP) that was called BluZEBRA.

Vulcan Inc: 2007-2013

Mumm worked as the Director of Executive Services directly for the Founder, Paul Allen and CEO. Mumm administered all of technology aspects for the co-founder of Microsoft. While at Vulcan Mumm supervised Paul's Band, Physical Security Detail, Media Operations, Executive Support and Onsite Support Operations for the owners.

Microsoft: 1994-2005

Mumm was a ten-year employee at Microsoft and served as Senior/Lead Program Manager, Product Manager and Executive Support technician at Microsoft for 10+ years. During this time he supervised many technology teams, and collaborated on the development of the original Xbox and one of the product visionaries for the creation of SharePoint Technologies.

Basketball career 
Nathan has been involved with coaching basketball since 1991 and has been a head coach in the college and professional ranks for many years.
He now serves and volunteers as a basket official with the Snohomish County Basketball Officials SCBBO

Coaching Record-

Career Record: 431 wins, 92 losses

Pro Career Record: 1 Year Head Coach - 2 Years Assistant Coach

Record as Head Coach: 8 wins 3 losses Snohomish County Explosion of the National Athletic Basketball League Head Coach (2010)

2 Years Assistant Coach - 28 wins - 9 losses
Nathan also served two years as an associate head coach, in the Semi-Pro League of the IBL In 2006 and then again in the 2008 season.

College Career Record: 3 Years Head Coach/Athletic Director 2003-2005

Record as Head Coach: 27 wins 18 losses. In 2004 was the NACCA National Champions with a tournament championship win over Reed College from Oregon. Nathan was both the head coach and Athletic Director at Puget Sound Christian College. 
https://web.archive.org/web/20050309055355/http://www.pscc.edu/page.aspx?id=45307

Basketball Press Links:

 In 2007-2010, Mumm served as the Snohomish County Explosion Chairman and was also the General Manager of the club in 2007-2008.

 In 2008, Mumm serves as assistant coach to fix defensive problems on the court.

 In 2004, Mumm starts his second year at PSCC and drops game to Alaska Fairbanks.

 Mumm and the Anchors drop their second game to NCAA Division II Alaska Fairbanks.

 Co-Founder and Commissioner of the NABL Nathan Mumm steps down as sale of the NABL moves to new ownership group led by Ty White.

Courtyard Media Foundation 
Mumm is the President of Courtyard Media Foundation.

 In 2006, Courtyard Media became the owner of the Snohomish County Explosion.
In 2010, Nathan became the Head Coach of the Snohomish County Explosion.
In 2022, Nathan was honored at KKNW1150am radio station "Spotlight of the Month" for TechTimeRadio with Nathan Mumm.

References

External links
Official website

1973 births
Living people
Sportspeople from Everett, Washington
Basketball coaches from Washington (state)
Basketball executives
Thunderbird School of Global Management alumni